Specimen are a British band founded in the 1980s. Their music has been described as spanning many different genres of music, including glam, goth, punk and post-punk, and the band is widely credited as one of the pioneers of the goth subculture, both musically and stylistically.

Early days
The band was formed in 1981 in Bristol, England by vocalist Olli Wisdom with guitarists Jon Klein (from Europeans) and Kevin Mills (from the X-Certs). Their first show was at a street party celebrating the wedding of Charles, Prince of Wales and Lady Diana Spencer. In 1982, the band relocated to Soho, London, where Wisdom founded the infamous Batcave weekly club-night. Ian Astbury described the band's unique hybrid of punk and glam: "Specimen were very dark, but they were as much German as they were The Addams Family. They were like a Death Bowie."

When approached by Wisdom and asked to join Specimen, original keyboardist Jonny Slut initially declined because he could not play any instruments. Wisdom insisted and Slut eventually learned to play the keyboard by utilizing guiding stickers. Sporting what would become known as deathhawk hair, Jonny Slut proved no less photogenic than frontman Olli himself in mascara and black lace.

While the band were together, they never released a full album, only singles and a mini album. However, in 1997, two full-length compilations were released featuring various Specimen songs. In 1985, the original Specimen lineup broke up after the release of the Sharp Teeth Pretty Teeth single. Olli Wisdom moved to San Francisco, California, USA and formed a short-lived American version of Specimen.

Post-Specimen
After the band went its separate ways, guitarist Jon Klein worked with Siouxsie and the Banshees for seven years, before working with Sinéad O'Connor. He was also in the British 1998 film Married 2 Malcolm in a non-speaking role.

Jonny Slut formed Diskord Datkord with Mark Tinley and Adam Tinley before going on to work with the KLF, Adamski and is now a member of Atomizer. He also founded the Nag Nag Nag club-night in London, where he was one of the house DJs.

Tim Huthert went on to join Until December, and more recently played with the re-formed Jetboy as well as recording the Electric Ballroom album with Jon Klein. He currently resides in New York.

Olli Wisdom went on to produce psychedelic trance music under the name Space Tribe.

Kevin Mills joined Flesh for Lulu.

Specimen today
In July 2008, the original 1983 line up got together to perform at the Batcave's 25th anniversary event in London, resulting in the release of the live album Specimen Alive at the Batcave on Metropolis. The reunion grew directly out of friendships rekindled during the making of 2007's Electric Ballroom album, which featured T.bias, Kimba, Stephan Byron-Salit, and Tim Huthert, as well as Jon Klein collaborations with Olli Wisdom and Jonny Slut.

In February 2009, Jonny Slut and Jon Klein appeared at the Fashion Institute of Technology (New York) for the symposium 'Subculture and Style' during the exhibition for the book Gothic Dark Glamour by Valery Steele and Jennifer Parks. The exhibition featured one of Jon Klein's 25-year-old stage outfits, alongside Alexander McQueen, John Galliano and Rick Owens.

In May 2011, the band confirmed via Facebook that Jonny Slut had officially retired from Specimen. In December of the same year, they announced the addition of Johann Bley, ex-Juno Reactor, was to replace Slut on keyboard.

In December 2011, the band announced that they were working with producer and Killing Joke bassist Youth on a new album. The following month, they revealed its name – Wake the Dead – and launched a Pledgemusic campaign to help fund the album for release in 2013.

Band members

Current members
Jon Klein – guitar, vocals
Johann Bley – keyboards
Kev Mills – bass, backing vocals
Chris Bell – drums

Former members
Olli Wisdom – vocals (died August 2021)
 Jonny Slut – keyboards, backing vocals
T.bias – vocals
Kimba – bass
Stephan Byron-Salit – guitar, backing vocals
Tim Huthert – drums
Jonathan Trevisick – drums
Peter Cook – keyboards
Danny Pepworth – drums
George Lynch  – bass, backing vocals
Smeg – guitar
Gere Fennelly – keyboards
Naunton – drums
Simeon – keyboards
Jonny Slag – bass
Jeff St. Pierre – drums

Discography

Albums
Electric Ballroom (2007), Metropolis Records
Wake the Dead (2013)

Compilations
Warm Wet Cling – Film Red Velvet Crush (1997)
Azoic (1997)

Live albums
Alive at the Batcave (2009), Metropolis Records/Eyeswideshut Recordings

Singles & EPs

See also
 Olli Wisdom

References

External links
Band Myspace page
Jon Klein of Specimen talks about the legendary Batcave, the band's reunion and their first ever actual album
Interview with Jon Klein of Specimen
About.com blurb on Specimen
Specimen – Wake the Dead on Pledge Music
 
 

1981 establishments in England
1985 disestablishments in England
English glam rock groups
English gothic rock groups
English new wave musical groups
Metropolis Records artists
Musical groups established in 1981
Musical groups disestablished in 1985
Musical groups from Bristol
Sire Records artists